Bibra is a former municipality in the district Schmalkalden-Meiningen, in Thuringia, Germany. From December 1, 2007 it is part of Grabfeld.

St. Leo's Church

The church dating from 1492 contains several works from Tilman Riemenschneider:Altar of the Apostles, Altar of the Church Fathers, and Altar of the Annunciation, Carving of St. Kilian, Crucifix, and epitaph of Hans von Bibra (the father of Lorenz von Bibra).  All are wood except the epitaph. The current church had three benefactors: Kilian von Bibra, Lorenz von Bibra, and Albrecht von Bibra.  All three were high church officials in Würzburg. Three benefactors hence three altar design and three coat-of-arms stained glass windows.

Photo gallery

References
Hartmann, Heinrich: Der Marktflecken Bibra. Eine Darstellung seiner politschen und kirchlichen Entwicklung. Festschrift zur 400 jährigen Jubelfeier der Grundsteinlegung der Kirche, den 17. Juli 1892, Vereins für Meiningische Geschichte und Landeskunde, 13. Heft., Meiningen 1892. L.v. Eyes Buchhandlung. 208 pages
Hintzenstern, Herbert von: Die Altäre in Bibra. Aus Riemenschneiders Werkstatt, Evangelische Verlagsanstalt, Berlin 1969 68 pages
Hintzenstern, Herbert von: Von Würzburg nach Bibra, Riemenschneideraltäre in Thüringen, Evangelische Verlagsanstalt, Berlin 1987
Die Untersuchung und Restaurierung des Verkündigungsaltares und eines Corpus Christi aus der Evangelischen Kirche St. Leo in Bibra, Arbeitsheft des Thüringischen Landesamtes für Denkmalpflege Neue Folge 3, E. Reinhold Verlag, Druckerei zu Altenburg, 2001, 96 pages,

External links
 Bibra page on the VG Grabfeld website
 Site of Thüringen Info
 The Grabfeld region
 St. Leo Kirche
 Official Site Burg Bibra e.V.
 Google Books Der Marktflecken Bibra 1892
 Markt Bibra, St. Leo Kirche, Burg Bibra, Neue Schloss Pages on vonbibra.net

Bibra
Former municipalities in Thuringia
Duchy of Saxe-Meiningen